Piravom State assembly constituency is one of the 140 state legislative assembly constituencies in Kerala state in southern India.  It is also one of the 7 state legislative assembly constituencies included in the Kottayam Lok Sabha constituency. As of the 2016 assembly elections, the current MLA is Anoop Jacob of KC(J).

Local self governed segments
Piravom Niyamasabha constituency is composed of the following local self-governed segments:

Members of Legislative Assembly 
The following list contains all members of Kerala legislative assembly who have represented the constituency:

Key

   

* indicates by-elections

Election results 
Percentage change (±%) denotes the change in the number of votes from the immediate previous election.

Niyamasabha Election 2021

Niyamasabha Election 2016 
There were 1,81,261 registered voters in the constituency for the 2016 Kerala Niyamasabha Election.

2012 by-election 
Piravom bye-election was held in Piravom assembly constituency following the death of sitting MLA and minister T. M. Jacob on 30 October 2011. There were 1,81,556 registered voters in the constituency for the resulting by-election

Niyamasabha Election 2011 
There were 1,59,877 registered voters in the constituency for the 2011 election.

See also
 Piravom
 Ernakulam district
 List of constituencies of the Kerala Legislative Assembly
 2016 Kerala Legislative Assembly election

References 

Assembly constituencies of Kerala

State assembly constituencies in Ernakulam district